Eveliina Anna Maria Summanen (born 29 May 1998) is a Finnish professional footballer who plays as a midfielder for Tottenham Hotspur and has appeared for the Finland women's national team.

Career
On 10 January 2022, Summanen joined FA WSL side Tottenham Hotspur for an undisclosed fee, signing a contract until 2023.

Summanen has been capped for the Finland national team, appearing for the team during the 2019 FIFA Women's World Cup qualifying cycle.

International goals

References

External links
 
 
 

1998 births
Living people
Finnish women's footballers
Finland women's international footballers
Women's association football midfielders
Damallsvenskan players
KIF Örebro DFF players
Kristianstads DFF players
Tottenham Hotspur F.C. Women players
Helsingin Jalkapalloklubi (women) players
UEFA Women's Euro 2022 players